Phetwason Or.Daokrajai is a Thai Muay Thai fighter.

Titles and accomplishments
Rajadamnern Stadium
 2015 Rajadamnern Stadium 118 lbs Champion
 2017 Rajadamnern Stadium Fighter of the Year

Fight record

|- style="background:#cfc;"
| 2022-03-30|| Win ||align=left| Yodtongthai Sor.Sommai || Palangmai, Rajadamnern Stadium || Bangkok, Thailand || Decision || 5 || 3:00
|-  style="background:#fbb;"
| 2021-12-13|| Loss||align=left| Chalam Parunchai || Kanla Krang Neung, Rajadamnern Stadium || Bangkok, Thailand ||Decision || 5 || 3:00

|- style="background:#cfc;"
| 2021-04-03|| Win ||align=left| Songkom Bangkokalaiyon || Lumpinee TKO, Lumpinee Stadium || Bangkok, Thailand || TKO (Jumping knee)|| 3 ||
|- style="background:#fbb;"
| 2019-07-24|| Loss ||align=left| Extra Rongsamak-OrBorJor.UdonThani || Petch Chao Phraya, Rajadamnern Stadium || Bangkok, Thailand || Decision || 5 || 3:00
|- style="background:#fbb;"
| 2019-06-20|| Loss ||align=left| Extra Rongsamak-OrBorJor.UdonThani || Sor.Sommai, Rajadamnern Stadium || Bangkok, Thailand || Decision || 5 || 3:00
|- style="background:#fbb;"
| 2019-05-16|| Loss ||align=left| Extra Sor.Siriluck || Chefboontham, Rajadamnern Stadium || Bangkok, Thailand || Decision || 5 || 3:00
|- style="background:#fbb;"
| 2019-01-28|| Loss ||align=left| Yamin PK.Saenchaimuaythaigym || Tor.Chaiwat, Rajadamnern Stadium || Bangkok, Thailand || Decision || 5 || 3:00
|- style="background:#cfc;"
| 2018-11-15|| Win ||align=left| Chanasuek Gor.Kampanat || Chefboontham, Rajadamnern Stadium || Bangkok, Thailand || Decision || 5 || 3:00
|-  style="background:#c5d2ea;"
| 2018-10-18|| Draw ||align=left| Superbank Mor Ratanabandit || Sor.Sommai, Rajadamnern Stadium || Bangkok, Thailand || Decision || 5 || 3:00
|- style="background:#fbb;"
| 2018-04-28|| Loss ||align=left| Kaonar P.K. Saenchai Muaythaigym || Phoenix 7 Phuket|| Phuket, Thailand || Decision || 5 || 3:00 
|-
! style=background:white colspan=9 |
|-  style="background:#fbb;"
| 2018-02-20|| Loss||align=left|  Phet Utong Or. Kwanmuang  || Lumpinee Stadium || Bangkok, Thailand || Decision || 5 || 3:00
|- style="background:#cfc;"
| 2018-01-25|| Win ||align=left| Kaonar P.K. Saenchai Muaythaigym || Rajadamnern Stadium || Bangkok, Thailand || Decision || 5 || 3:00
|- style="background:#cfc;"
| 2017-12-21|| Win ||align=left| Petchnamngam Or.Kwanmuang|| Rajadamnern Stadium 72nd Anniversary Sor.Sommai + Chefboontham || Bangkok, Thailand || Decision || 5 || 3:00
|-  style="background:#cfc;"
| 2017-11-15|| Win ||align=left| Superbank Mor Ratanabandit || Tor.Chaiwat, Rajadamnern Stadium || Bangkok, Thailand || Decision || 5 || 3:00
|-  style="background:#cfc;"
| 2017-09-11|| Win ||align=left| Thepbuth SitUudom || Sor.Sommai, Rajadamnern Stadium || Bangkok, Thailand || Decision || 5 || 3:00
|-  style="background:#cfc;"
| 2017-08-10|| Win ||align=left| Petchthaksin Sor.Sommai || Bangrajan, Rajadamnern Stadium || Bangkok, Thailand || KO (Knees)|| 4 ||
|-  style="background:#cfc;"
| 2017-07-10|| Win ||align=left| Rangkhao Wor.Sangprapai   || Rajadamnern Stadium  || Bangkok, Thailand || Decision || 5 || 3:00
|-
! style=background:white colspan=9 |
|-  style="background:#c5d2ea;"
| 2017-04-27|| Draw ||align=left| Tawanchai P.K. Saenchai Muaythaigym || Lumpinee Stadium || Bangkok, Thailand || Decision || 5 || 3:00
|-  style="background:#cfc;"
| 2017-03-02|| Win||align=left| Petchdam Petchyindee Academy || Rajadamnern Stadium || Bangkok, Thailand || Decision || 5 || 3:00
|-  style="background:#cfc;"
| 2017-01-26|| Win||align=left| Mongkolchai Kwaitonggym || Rajadamnern Stadium || Bangkok, Thailand || Decision || 5 || 3:00
|-  style="background:#cfc;"
| 2016-11-17|| Win||align=left| Prakyphet Nitisamui || Rajadamnern Stadium || Bangkok, Thailand || KO (Punches)|| 2 ||
|-  style="background:#cfc;"
| 2016-09-22|| Win||align=left| Weerachai Wor.Wiwattananon || Rajadamnern Stadium || Bangkok, Thailand || Decision || 5 || 3:00
|-  style="background:#cfc;"
| 2016-07-18|| Win||align=left| Weerachai Wor.Wiwattananon || Rajadamnern Stadium || Bangkok, Thailand || Decision || 5 || 3:00
|-  style="background:#cfc;"
| 2016-06-24|| Win||align=left| Sengdaw Phetsimuen || Lumpinee Stadium || Bangkok, Thailand || Decision || 5 || 3:00
|-  style="background:#cfc;"
| 2016-05-30|| Win||align=left| Sengdaw Phetsimuen || Rajadamnern Stadium || Bangkok, Thailand || Decision || 5 || 3:00
|-  style="background:#fbb;"
| 2016-04-18|| Loss ||align=left| Sonnarai Sor.Sommai || Rajadamnern Stadium || Bangkok, Thailand || Decision || 5 || 3:00
|-  style="background:#fbb;"
| 2016-03-23|| Loss ||align=left| Methee Sor.Jor.Toipaedriew || Rajadamnern Stadium || Bangkok, Thailand || Decision || 5 || 3:00
|-  style="background:#cfc;"
| 2016-02-18|| Win||align=left| Morakot Komsaimai || Rajadamnern Stadium || Bangkok, Thailand || Decision || 5 || 3:00
|-  style="background:#cfc;"
| 2016-01-24|| Win||align=left| Puenkon Diamond98 || Rangsit Stadium || Rangsit, Thailand || Decision || 5 || 3:00
|-  style="background:#cfc;"
| 2015-11-18|| Win||align=left| Fonpet Chuwattana || Rajadamnern Stadium || Bangkok, Thailand || Decision || 5 || 3:00
|-
! style=background:white colspan=9 |
|-  style="background:#cfc;"
| 2015-10-24|| Win||align=left| Thanai-K Lukkaokwang  || Montree Studio || Bangkok, Thailand || Decision || 5 || 3:00
|-  style="background:#cfc;"
| 2015-09-28|| Win||align=left| Nichao Suvitgym  || Rajadamnern Stadium || Bangkok, Thailand || Decision || 5 || 3:00
|-  style="background:#fbb;"
| 2015-08-27|| Loss||align=left| Nichao Suvitgym  || Rajadamnern Stadium || Bangkok, Thailand || Decision || 5 || 3:00
|-  style="background:#cfc;"
| 2015-08-05|| Win||align=left| Nongbeer Sor.Jor.Vichitpaedriew || Rajadamnern Stadium || Bangkok, Thailand || Decision || 5 || 3:00
|-  style="background:#cfc;"
| 2015-07-08|| Win ||align=left| Kompatak SinbiMuayThai || Rajadamnern Stadium || Bangkok, Thailand ||Decision  || 5 || 3:00
|-  style="background:#cfc;"
| 2015-06-15|| Win||align=left| Pakorn Sor.Kingrat || Rajadamnern Stadium || Bangkok, Thailand || KO || 4 ||
|-  style="background:#cfc;"
| 2015-04-08|| Win||align=left| Yokmorakot Wor.Sangprapai || Rajadamnern Stadium || Bangkok, Thailand || Decision || 5 || 3:00
|-  style="background:#fbb;"
| 2015-02-06|| Loss ||align=left| Yothin FA Group || Lumpinee Stadium ||Bangkok, Thailand || Decision  || 5 || 3:00
|-  style="background:#fbb;"
| 2015-01-11|| Loss ||align=left| Kunhan Chor.Hapayak || Rangsit Stadium ||Rangsit, Thailand || Decision  || 5 || 3:00
|-
| colspan=9 | Legend:

References

Phetwason Or.Daokrajai
Living people
1997 births
Phetwason Or.Daokrajai